Nason (also: Amekan kondre) is a village of Paramacca Maroons in the Sipaliwini District of Suriname. The village is located on an island in the Marowijne River.

History
The village was originally known as Amekan kondre after their chief Amekan. It has been renamed Nason after the Nassau Mountains which are visible in the distance.

The Redemptorists, Catholic missionaries, were active in the Paramaccan territory during the 19th and 20th century. In 1938, they founded the Anton Domici school and a library in the village. Because there were small isolated villages in the territory, the school offered boarding facilities. In 1985, the boarding school had a capacity of 21 beds. A health care clinic was provided by Medische Zending.

Before the Surinamese Interior War (1986-1992), Nason was one of the largest settlements of the tribe, During the war, the Paramaccans sided with the Jungle Commando, which resulted in a large scale migration to French Guiana, and the destruction of the boarding school and clinic. The facilities have been restored except for the nearby Nason airstrip.

The economy of the village is mainly based on subsistence farming, and gold mining.

References

Bibliography
 

Islands of Suriname
Paramaka settlements
Populated places in Sipaliwini District